Nanaimo—Alberni was a federal electoral district in British Columbia, Canada, that was represented in the House of Commons of Canada from 1979 to 1988. It was subsequently recreated and was represented in the House of Commons from 1997 to 2015.

Demographics

Nanaimo—Alberni has the highest median age of all federal electoral districts in Canada (50.1 years of age).

Geography

From 1979 to 1988, it consisted of:
 the Alberni-Clayoquot Regional District,
 the Nanaimo Regional District,
 (Lasqueti Island and the adjacent smaller islands in the Powell River Regional District,
 the northwest part of Electoral Area H of the Cowichan Valley Regional District.

The present district includes Lasqueti Island, the Regional District of Alberni-Clayoquot, and all of the Regional District of Nanaimo except the extreme southeastern part, including but the extreme northern part of Nanaimo. The southern part of Nanaimo is part of the Nanaimo—Cowichan electoral district.

History

This electoral district was originally created in 1976 from parts of Comox—Alberni and Nanaimo—Cowichan—The Islands ridings.

It was abolished in 1987 when it was redistributed into Comox—Alberni and Nanaimo—Cowichan.

It was re-created in 1996 from those two ridings.

The 2012 electoral redistribution will see this riding dissolved into the new ridings of Courtenay—Alberni and Nanaimo—Ladysmith for the 2015 election.

Members of Parliament

This riding has elected the following Members of Parliament:

Election results

Nanaimo—Alberni, 1997–2015

Nanaimo—Alberni, 1979–1988

See also
 List of Canadian federal electoral districts
 Past Canadian electoral districts

References

 Library of Parliament Riding Profile (1976 - 1987)
 Library of Parliament Riding Profile (1996-present)
 Campaign expense data from Elections Canada - 2008
 Expenditures - 2004
 Expenditures - 2000
 Expenditures - 1997

Notes

External links
 Website of the Parliament of Canada
 Map of Nanaimo—Alberni archived by Elections Canada

Defunct British Columbia federal electoral districts on Vancouver Island
Parksville, British Columbia
Politics of Nanaimo
Port Alberni